Lele, also known as Nanjing Lele, is the official mascot of the Nanjing 2014 Summer Youth Olympics. Lele is based on Yuhua stones, which come in the colors of red, pink, yellow, white and green. It is short and robust with bulging eyes, always wearing a smile. After a competition, the stone was chosen to represent the games. The word ‘lele’ represents the sound of stones colliding together and is pronounced like the Chinese word meaning happiness or joy. The mascot was revealed to the public by Chinese Olympic champions Sun Yang, Huang Xu and Wu Jingyu.

References

Olympic mascots